The song "Backwater Blues" is a blues and jazz standard written by Bessie Smith. Smith (on vocal with James P. Johnson  on piano) recorded it as "Back-water Blues" on February 17, 1927, in New York City.

Background
The song has long been associated with the Great Mississippi Flood of 1927. However, that flood was at its worst some two months after the song was written. Study of Smith's touring itinerary, of testimony of fellow entertainers who toured with her, and of contemporary reports indicates that the song was written in response to the flood that struck Nashville, Tennessee on Christmas Day 1926.

Composition

The lyrics are in the often-used AAB blues format. The words vary from one performer to another; this opening verse is representative:

See also
 List of jazz standards

References

Songs about floods
1927 songs
1920s jazz standards
American songs
Blues songs
Bessie Smith songs
Columbia Records singles